Les Trois Mousquetaires (The Three Musketeers) is a 1921 French silent adventure film serial directed by Henri Diamant-Berger based on the 1844 novel by Alexandre Dumas, père.

Plot summary

Cast
 Aimé Simon-Girard ...  d'Artagnan 
 Henri Rollan ...  Athos
 Charles Martinelli ...  Porthos
 Pierre de Guingand ...  Aramis 
 Pierrette Madd ...  Madame Bonacieux 
 Jean Joffre ...  M. Bonacieux 
 Jeanne Desclos ...  The queen Anne d'Autriche 
 Édouard de Max ...  Richelieu 
 Claude Mérelle ...  Milady de Winter 
 Henri Baudin ...  Rochefort 
 Charles Dullin...  Father Joseph 
 Maxime Desjardins ...  Tréville 
 Armand Bernard ...  Planchet 
 Louis Pré Fils ...  Grimaud 
 Antoine Stacquet ...  Bazin 
 Marcel Vallée ...  Mousqueton 
 Germaine Larbaudrière ...  The duchesse de Chevreuse 
 Gaston Jacquet ...  De Winter 
 Blanche Altem ...  Doña Estefana 
 Mme. Joffre ...  The Mother Superior
 Georgette Sorelle ...  A sister
 Paul Hubert ...  Falton

References

External links 
 
 
 

1921 films
Film serials
1920s adventure drama films
French black-and-white films
Films based on The Three Musketeers
Films set in the 1620s
Films set in France
Films set in Paris
Cultural depictions of Cardinal Richelieu
French silent films
French adventure drama films
1921 drama films
Silent adventure drama films
1920s French films